Indecent Publications Act may refer to:

Indecent Publications Act 1910 in New Zealand
Indecent Publications Act 1963 in New Zealand
Various state-based acts in Australia